The LM-33 is a four-axle Soviet tram, produced by the Petersburg Tram Mechanical Factory (PTMF) from 1933 to 1939.

History
In the early 1930s, D.I. Kondratiev and a group of Leningrad specialists visited America to learn about local developments. A new model of the Leningrad tram was derived from this research trip based on the Peter Witt design. The design was modified in accordance with Soviet domestic requirements; in particular, the width of the wagon was reduced. The first tram of this design was produced by PTMF. It was originally named MA (Mоторный Aмериканского типа), and its unpowered trailer was named PA (rus. ПА, Прицепной Aмериканского типa).  The model quickly earned the nickname "American". Later for political reasons, the wagon names were changed to LM-33 (Leningradsky Motorny projekta 1933 goda) and LP-33 (Leningradsky Pritsepnoy projekta 1933 goda), respectively.

LM-33 and LP-33 were built between 1933 and 1939.

Operation
LM-33/LP-33 trains were operated in Leningrad from 1933 until March 18, 1979.

Half Life 2 beta model
An unused HL2 model seen in the HL2 leak maps "e3_c17_02.vmf" and "prefab_streets_blvd.vmf", as well as a prerelease version of the train station is thought to resemble the LM-33. Half-Life 2, for most of its development had an Eastern European style and the vehicles tended to reflect the Soviet style.

Preservation
Two copies of LM-33 have survived in the electric transportation museum in Saint Petersburg: motor 4275 (undergoing restoration) and the loading platform at the LM-33 No. 4435 (awaiting restoration). An LP-33 trailer (number 4454) is also being restored.

See also
 Trams in Saint Petersburg

References

External links

 LM-33 at site «Ретро-трамвай - Петербургская классика.» 
 LM-33 at site «Нижегородский Трамвай-Троллейбус» 
 LM-33 at site «piter-tram.de» 

Soviet tram vehicles